The Springwood Bus Station, in Springwood, is serviced by TransLink bus routes. It is a major interchange for TransLink's Southern Region, being an important stop for Logan City Bus Service routes between Brisbane and Loganholme. The architecture of the station is based upon the steel and glass designs of Brisbane's busway stations. It is in Zone 2 of the TransLink integrated public transport system.

As part of the upgrade of the Pacific Motorway between Eight Mile Plains and Daisy Hill commenced in 2020, the South East Busway will be extended to Springwood bus station. The Pacific Highway upgrade and the Busway extension is expected to be completed in 2024.

References

External links
 Translink South East Busway Extension

Bus stations in South East Queensland
Public transport in Brisbane
Buildings and structures in Logan City